Radclive is a village on the River Great Ouse just over  west of Buckingham in Buckinghamshire, England. It is in the civil parish of Radclive-cum-Chackmore in Aylesbury Vale district.

Radclive's toponym is derived from the Old English for "red cliff", referring to the colour of the local soil and a cliff overlooking the river. The Domesday Book of 1086 records the village as Radeclive.

Parts of the Church of England parish church of Saint John the Evangelist date from 1200 but the tower is believed to be 100 years later. There are some rare early English pews decorated with poppy heads, and a Jacobean communion rail with openwork balustrading. The nave window contains some examples of 14th century stained glass that survived the English Reformation and the English Civil War.

The Manor House was built in about 1620 and is the remaining part of a much larger mansion. The house contains an original oak staircase which has an open balustrade with finial topped ovals and lozenges, very similar in design to the staircase at Princes Risborough Manor House.

References

External links

Villages in Buckinghamshire